Jerry Ruben Lucena (born 11 August 1980) is a retired Filipino footballer and currently the manager of the U19 squad of Esbjerg fB.

He has represented the Philippines national football team at international level, having previously featured in the Denmark U-21 and Denmark League XI international teams.

Club career
Lucena started playing for the youth side of Danish football club Esbjerg fB. In 1999, he made his professional debut for Esbjerg in the Danish 1st Division, the second highest football league in the country. Esbjerg won promotion to the top-flight Danish Superliga in 2001. Lucena was a mainstay in the team during the 2002-03 Danish Superliga season, playing of 32 of 33 games as Esbjerg finished 5th and qualified for the European UEFA Cup tournament.

On 14 August 2003, Lucena played his first European game for Esbjerg in the qualifying round of the 2003–04 UEFA Cup. His club won 5–0 against Andorran football club FC Santa Coloma in his debut. Esbjerg would advance to the next round on a 9–1 aggregate result. Lucena played all 33 games, as Esbjerg won bronze medals in the 2003-04 Danish Superliga championship. In 2006, he was part of the Esbjerg team which reached the final of the Danish Cup, but lost to Randers FC. He played a total 245 senior games for Esbjerg, before leaving the club in 2007.

Lucena signed with Superliga rival club AGF Aarhus in 2007, one of the oldest sport clubs in Danish football. Jerry Lucena played full back and occasionally the midfielder position for AGF. When AGF were relegated to the Danish 1st Division in 2010, Lucena stayed with the club. He helped AGF win the 2010–11 Danish 1st Division, getting promotion for the Superliga.

He had the remainder of his AGF contract annulled in June 2012, in order to go back to Esbjerg.

Lucena's contract with Esbjerg end in Summer 2016 when Lucena will be retiring from competitive football as a player. As part of a final agreement with the club, he served as assistant coach to the club's youth team in the U19 League, and is targeting to pass the exam in May 2016 to be a T-trainer enabling him to acquire an A-license, the second highest coaching license in the DBU.

International career
Born to a Filipino father and a Danish mother, Lucena was eligible to represent either side at the international level. Initially, he was called up to represent the Denmark U-21 squad in 2001. In 2006, Lucena again represented Denmark as part of its League XI international football team, which is an unofficial national team assembled by the Danish Football Association to evaluate the level of the best players from the Danish Superliga.

Lucena switched to represent the Philippines in March 2011. On 23 March 2011, he made his international debut for the Philippines national team against the Palestine team in the 2012 AFC Challenge Cup qualifying round. The match ended in a 0–0 draw, but the Philippines would eventually clinch the second spot in their bracket to qualify for the group stage of the 2012 AFC Challenge Cup. On 11 October 2011, Lucena again represented the Philippines in an international friendly match against Nepal, which ended in a 4–0 win for the Philippines.

In November 2012, Lucena is part of the Philippine team in the Group A stage of the 2012 AFF Suzuki Cup, the football championship cup for Southeast Asia. The Philippines finished second in the group with 2 wins and 1 loss record, qualifying them to semi finals versus Singapore. Lucena was instrumental in the Philippine squad defense wherein he played in two games : Thailand 2–1 Philippines and Vietnam 0–1 Philippines. Lucena will once again reprise his role in the midfield in the second leg of the 2012 AFF Suzuki Cup Semi-finals against Singapore.

Retirement
It was reported on March 15, 2016, that Lucena has informed the Philippine Football Federation his retirement from international football due to recurring injury issues. He would have played the last two 2018 FIFA World Cup qualifiers matches of the Philippines against North Korea and Uzbekistan. Lucena spent his time with the Philippine national team as a means to connect with his second homeland especially after the death of his Filipino father.

International goals
As of 3 September 2015.

Honours

Club
Esbjerg fB
Danish Cup: 2013

National team
Philippine Peace Cup: 2013
AFC Challenge Cup: Runner-up 2014

References

 Lucena skal være træner og mentor i EfB, bold.dk, 26 May 2016

External links
 
 National team profile
 Career statistics at Danmarks Radio
 Danish League official statistics
 

1980 births
Living people
People from Esbjerg
Citizens of the Philippines through descent
Danish people of Filipino descent
Filipino people of Danish descent
Danish men's footballers
Filipino footballers
Filipino expatriate footballers
Denmark under-21 international footballers
Philippines international footballers
Association football fullbacks
Association football midfielders
Danish Superliga players
Aarhus Gymnastikforening players
Esbjerg fB players
Filipino football head coaches
Sportspeople from the Region of Southern Denmark